The Chamber of Nationalities was the upper house of the bicameral Union Parliament of Burma (Myanmar) from 1948 to 1962.  Under the 1947 Constitution, bills initiated and passed by the lower house, the Chamber of Deputies, were to be sent to the Chamber of Nationalities for review and revision. The Chamber of Nationalities was primarily formed to give minorities within Burma some political power in the national government.

It consisted of 125 seats, with the constitution providing for specified numbers of representatives from all states and divisions. 25 seats were allotted to Shan State, 12 to Kachin State, 8 seats to Special Division of the Chins (now Chin State), 3 seats to Karenni State (now Kayah State), 24 to ethnic Karens, and 53 to all other territories (including divisions), including 4 seats reserved specifically for the Anglo-Burmese community. The Parliament was abolished after Ne Win suspended the 1947 Constitution in a military coup. A single-party unicameral People's Assembly replaced the Parliament in 1974.

Speakers of the Chamber of Nationalities

References

Legislatures of Myanmar
1948 establishments in Burma
1962 disestablishments in Burma
Defunct upper houses